Vladimir Prosin (Cyrillic: Владимир Просин; born 15 August 1959) is a retired Russian sprinter specialising in the 400 metres who competed for the Soviet Union. He took part at the 1987 World Championships and the 1991 World Indoor Championships.

His personal bests in the event is 45.47 outdoors (Kiev 1984) and 46.95 seconds indoors (Volgograd 1988).

International competitions

1Did not finish in the final

References

1959 births
Living people
Russian male sprinters
Soviet male sprinters
World Athletics Championships athletes for the Soviet Union
Universiade medalists in athletics (track and field)
Goodwill Games medalists in athletics
Universiade silver medalists for the Soviet Union
Medalists at the 1987 Summer Universiade
Competitors at the 1986 Goodwill Games